Qullpani (Aymara qullpa saltpeter, -ni a suffix to indicate ownership, "the one with saltpeter", also spelled Kollpani) is a  mountain in the Cordillera Real in the Andes of Bolivia. It is located in the La Paz Department, Los Andes Province, Pucarani Municipality. Qullpani lies south of a lake named Juri Quta.

See also 
 Jach'a Jipiña

References 

Mountains of La Paz Department (Bolivia)